Statistics of J.League Division 2 in the 1999 season.

Overview
This was the first season of J2, the professional second tier in Japan. It replaced the JFL, which was moved to the 3rd tier. The league was contested by 10 teams, and Kawasaki Frontale won the championship.

Team changes

Final table

References

J2 League seasons
2
Japan
Japan